The Office of Nuclear Reactor Regulation, is a subordinate part of the United States Nuclear Regulatory Commission.

The office should not be confused with the NRC's Nuclear Regulatory Research. The office's current director is William Dean. It has deputy directorates for two areas: (1) Reactor Safety Programs and (2) Engineering and Corporate Support.  It has program management, policy development and analysis staff as well as an array of divisions.

The Office of Nuclear Reactor Regulation is responsible for ensuring the public health and safety through licensing and inspection activities at commercial nuclear power plants. However, the evaluation of license renewal applications is conducted by its Division of License Renewal. Of current interest to the public and elected officials is the proposed renewal license for the Diablo Canyon Power Plant, which is also sometimes referred to as the Diablo Canyon Nuclear Power Plant. According to Victor Dricks, senior public affairs officer for NRC Region IV,  the NRC recently conducted a review of the over 100 nuclear power plants in the United States, including Diablo Canyon, and the "found a high level of preparedness and strong capability in terms of equipment and procedures to respond to severe events..."

Scope of authority 
The office is in charge of nuclear reactor safety for the United States Nuclear Regulatory Commission.  Its mandate includes four main areas: 
 Rulemaking
 Licensing
 Oversight
 Incident response team

Jurisdiction 
 Commercial nuclear power reactors
 Test and research reactors

Mandate 
The office is charged with the priorities to protect the public health, safety, and the environment. It frequently works in conjunction with the NRC regional organizational structure and other task focused offices for these purposes. It works with the regions and other offices to accomplish its mission and contribute to the agency mission.

Divisions 
 Safety Systems
 Component Integrity
 Engineering
 Risk Assessment
 License Renewal
 Operating Reactor Licensing
 Inspection and Regional Support
 Policy and Rulemaking

Reorganization 
In 1999, the office underwent reorganization under the aegis of the then-Director Samuel J. Collins.

Role during Three Mile Island accident 
In 1979, the Office of Nuclear Reactor Regulation played a key role in the Three Mile Island accident that occurred in Pennsylvania. The office's director at the time, Harold Denton, personally advised President Jimmy Carter throughout the crisis. This direct liaison is notable in that it was NRC Chairman Joseph Hendrie, Denton's superior, who interacted with Pennsylvania's governor Dick Thornburgh. This event provoked considerable public interest that coincided with release of the film The China Syndrome, galvanizing public opinion on nuclear policy in the United States. Given this context, President Carter was advised to walk into the crisis zone in person in order to demonstrate that the dangers were not as high as many believed. These events occurred at approximately the same time as the beginning of the J. Samuel Walker term of service as the official historian of the NRC and are documented by him in Three Mile Island: A Nuclear Crisis in Historical Perspective.

See also 
Atomic Safety and Licensing Board
Nuclear safety
Nuclear safety in the United States
Nuclear policy in the United States
Nuclear Accident Response Organisation
Nuclear energy policy in the United States
United States Nuclear Regulatory Commission

References

External links 
 US Nuclear Regulatory Commission
 Nuclear power safety and security

Nuclear safety and security
Nuclear power in the United States
Nuclear Regulatory Commission